Eressa pleurosticta is a moth of the family Erebidae. It was described by George Hampson in 1910. It is found in the Democratic Republic of the Congo.

References

 

Eressa
Moths described in 1910
Endemic fauna of the Democratic Republic of the Congo